Åke Leonard Lindman (born Åke Leonard Järvinen; 11 January 1928 – 3 March 2009) was a Finnish director and actor.

In his youth Lindman was a football player, playing defence for the Finnish national team during the Olympics in Helsinki 1952. He represented the football club HIFK in the Finnish league where he played 81 games and scored 9 goals, he also played in second division for 8 seasons. In the 1960s, the British English Football League club Swindon Town F.C. wanted to sign him, but he turned them down to focus on his acting career.

Åke Lindman's breakthrough as an actor came with his role as the stubborn soldier Lehto in the Edvin Laine filmThe Unknown Soldier in 1955. Later, he would also achieve fame as captain Torsten Jansson in the Swedish soap opera Rederiet. Lindman also found success as the director of, amongst others, the television series Stormskärs Maja and the film Framom främsta linjen, a movie about the Finland-Swedish infantry regiment 61 during the defence of the Karelian Isthmus in 1944. His final film was the war film Tali-Ihantala 1944.  Lindman won two Jussi Awards, one for Best Director in 1988 and a Lifetime Achievement award in 2008.

Personal life
Lindman was born in Helsinki and grew up in a working class Vallila neighbourhood. His father was a truck driver. His brother Tor, who also became a footballer, was born in 1930. In 1932, his father Väinö Järvinen died from pneumonia, and some years later his mother Edit remarried to Gösta Lindman. Lindman was already an adult when he was legally adopted and changed his surname to his step-fathers.

Filmography (selection)

Actor

1949: Hornankoski – Artturi Yli-Koskela
1950: Tanssi yli hautojen – Suomalainen upseeri
1950: Hallin Janne – Vallankumoukseen yllyttävä vanki Siperiassa
1952: Suomalaistyttöjä Tukholmassa – Erik
1952: The White Reindeer – forest ranger
1952: Yö on pitkä – Åke Strandberg
1953: Varsovan laulu – Captain
1953: Pekka Puupää – Petteri, the criminal (uncredited)
1953: We Come During Spring – Kymppi, lumberjack boss
1954: Kovanaama – Prisoner #2
1954: Niskavuoren Aarne – Steward
1954: Pekka ja Pätkä lumimiehen jäljillä – Riku Sundman
1955: Kiinni on ja pysyy – Arpi
1955: Kukonlaulusta kukonlauluun – Eino Kustaala
1955: Rakkaus kahleissa – Pertti Kuusi
1955: Viettelysten tie – Martti
1955: The Unknown Soldier – Lehto
1956: Silja – nuorena nukkunut – Valkoisten komppanianpäällikkö
1956: Olet mennyt minun vereeni – Erkki, captain
1957: Risti ja liekki – Inkvisiittori
1957: 1918 – Samuel Bro
1957: Herra Sotaministeri – German ambassador (uncredited)
1957: Vihdoinkin hääyö... – Teemu Järvinen
1957: No Tomorrow – Förrymd fånge
1958: The Lady in Black – David Frohm
1959: Ei ruumiita makuuhuoneeseen – Mike
1959:  – Lumberjack
1959: Kohtalo tekee siirron – Mauri Petäjämaa
1960: Lumisten metsien tyttö – Jukka
1960: Isaskar Keturin ihmeelliset seikkailut – Anselmi Körmy
1961: Pojken i trädet – Sten Sundberg
1961: Kuu on vaarallinen – Nimismies
1961: Kertokaa se hänelle... – Ambulanceman
1961: Me – Urpo
1962: Älä nuolase... – Muuttomies (uncredited)
1962: Hän varasti elämän – Detective Oke Järvinen
1962: Naiset, jotka minulle annoit
1963: Villin Pohjolan kulta – Joel Vorna
1963: Teerenpeliä – Technical Manager (uncredited)
1963: Villin Pohjolan salattu laakso – Joel Vorna
1964: Make Like a Thief – Arvo Mäki
1965: Laukaus Kyproksessa – Vääpeli Onni Lintula
1967: Billion Dollar Brain – Minor Role (uncredited)
1968: The Shoes of the Fisherman – Soldier Releasing Lakota (uncredited)
1972: The Day the Clown Cried – Stout Prisoner
1977: Telefon – Lieutenant Alexandrov
1978: Tuntematon ystävä – Olavi Susikoski
1978: Bomsalva – Rurik Lindgren
1981: Reds – Scandinavian Escort
1982: Jousiampuja – Eino
1982: Klippet – Lagerförmannen
1983: Kalabaliken i Bender
1984: Dirty Story – Erik Järnstedt
1987:  (TV Movie) – David Dreyer
1987: Lain ulkopuolella – Principal
1988: Kråsnålen (TV Mini-Series) – Ågren the Smith
1990: Ameriikan raitti – Otto
1991: Riktiga män bär alltid slips – Stålhane
1993: Harjunpää ja kiusantekijät – Emergency response center (voice, uncredited)
1995: Mannen utan ansikte – President (voice)
1996: The Hunters – The Boss
1996: Yöjuna – Kalevi Wallin
1999: En liten julsaga – Pekka
2003: Kohtalon kirja – Galagf (final film role)

Director
1964: Make Like a Thief (co-director with Richard Long and Palmer Thompson)
1999: Lapin kullan kimallus
2004: Framom främsta linjen
2007: Tali-Ihantala 1944

References

External links

Obituary from the Helsingin Sanomat English Edition

1928 births
2009 deaths
Footballers from Helsinki
Finnish male film actors
Finnish film directors
Finnish footballers
Finland international footballers
Footballers at the 1952 Summer Olympics
Olympic footballers of Finland
Swedish-speaking Finns
Finnish television directors
Finnish screenwriters
Finnish television writers
20th-century Finnish male actors
21st-century Finnish male actors
20th-century Finnish writers
21st-century Finnish writers
HIFK Fotboll players
Association football defenders
Male television writers
20th-century screenwriters